Port of Mystery is a compilation album by keyboardist and composer Yanni, released on the Windham Hill label in 1997. The album peaked at #4 on Billboard's "Top New Age Albums" chart and at #142 on the "Billboard 200" chart in the same year. The title was taken from a song of the same name.

Track listing

Notes
"Port of Mystery" is most well known around the web as being one of the background tracks used in The "Concept Unification" installation videotape from 1989, which instructed the process that replaced The Rock-afire Explosion animatronic band at ShowBiz Pizza Place with characters from Chuck E. Cheese's due to a licensing disagreement with Creative Engineering.

References

External links
Official Website

Yanni albums
1997 compilation albums